Flavio Tattarini (born 14 August 1943, in Santa Fiora) is an Italian politician.

Biography
Former member of the Italian Communist Party, he was elected Mayor of Grosseto on 15 February 1982 after the resignation of mayor Giovanni Battista Finetti. He was re-elected in 1985 and resigned on 7 August 1987 after an internal government crisis. Re-elected for the third time in 1988, he remained in office until 23 January 1992, when he resigned again in order to run for the Chamber of Deputies at the 1992 Italian general election.

He served at the Italian Parliament for three legislatures (XI, XII, XIII).

See also
1985 Italian local elections
1988 Italian local elections
1992 Italian general election
1994 Italian general election
1996 Italian general election
List of mayors of Grosseto

References

Bibliography

External links

1943 births
Living people
Mayors of Grosseto
Democrats of the Left politicians
Democratic Party of the Left politicians
Italian Communist Party politicians
Deputies of Legislature XI of Italy
Deputies of Legislature XII of Italy
Deputies of Legislature XIII of Italy